Emre Kızılkaya (born 6 July 1982, in Istanbul) is a Turkish journalist and researcher who is a vice-chair of the Vienna-based International Press Institute, a global network of leading editors and media executives.

Career

Kizilkaya worked in various positions, including foreign news editor and managing editor of digital news, at the leading Turkish daily Hürriyet from 2003 to 2019.

Soon after the last independent mainstream media company left in Turkey was taken over by a staunchly pro-government corporation, Kizilkaya resigned from the Turkish newspaper and went ahead to study sustainable journalism at Harvard University as a Knight Visiting Nieman Fellow in 2019.  

As of 2022, Kizilkaya works as the project editor of Journo.com.tr, a non-profit news website for Turkey’s next-generation journalists, and as a Ph.D. researcher on media studies at Galatasaray University in Istanbul. 

As a journalist, a media executive and a press freedom advocate, Kizilkaya has been extensively interviewed and quoted by the international media, including The New York Times, The Guardian, CNN, BBC, Reuters, Agence France-Presse, Associated Press, Le Figaro, Le Nouvel Observateur, Corriere della Sera, Deutsche Welle, Süddeutsche Zeitung, Asahi Shimbun, South China Morning Post, The Intercept, Yedioth Ahronoth and Al Jazeera.

Throughout his career, Kizilkaya interviewed numerous leaders including presidents, prime ministers, and opinionmakers in Turkey and around the world for news reports and research projects. He contributed to several international and national publications, including Nieman Reports,
Al-Monitor and The Huffington Post.

Awards and education

In 2017, Kizilkaya was awarded in the Best Use of Video category by the U.S.-based International News Media Association for producing Turkey's first VR news story, and as the Best Digital Columnist by Turkish Journalists' Association for his articles on how digital transformation affects free speech.

In 2018, the Turkish Journalists' Association selected Kizilkaya as the Digital Journalist of the Year for his investigation into the correlations between Google searches and Turkey's official data, revealing previously unreported trends and public-interest information on a wide range of issues including migrants, domestic violence, water pollution, and terrorism.

In 2021, Kizilkaya co-produced an in-depth study into Turkey’s emerging news deserts, which was shortlisted in the Top 100 in the Sigma Awards 2022, a competition to celebrate the best data journalism from around the world. 

Emre Kizilkaya has a B.A degree in Political Science and International Relations from Istanbul University, and an M.A degree in Journalism from Marmara University. As of 2022, Kizilkaya’s Ph.D. research at Galatasaray University focused on the relationship between public trust and digital media.

External links

 The personal website of Emre Kizilkaya

References 

1982 births
Living people
Writers from Istanbul
Turkish journalists
Hürriyet people